Byrd Township is one of ten townships in Cape Girardeau County, Missouri, USA.  As of the 2000 census, its population was 15,693.

History
Byrd Township was founded in 1807 as one of the original five townships of Cape Girardeau County. The township has the name of Abraham Byrd, a county commissioner.

Geography
It contains ten cemeteries: Byrd, Herzinger, Horrell, Howard, Mogler, Ramsey, Russell, Russell Heights, Slinkerd and Walker.

The streams of Cane Creek, Goose Creek, Helderman Creek and Horrell Creek run through this township.

References

 USGS Geographic Names Information System (GNIS)

External links
 US-Counties.com
 City-Data.com

Townships in Cape Girardeau County, Missouri
Cape Girardeau–Jackson metropolitan area
Townships in Missouri